Lowell E. Norland (born August 14, 1931) was an American politician in the state of Iowa.

Norland was born in Mason City, Iowa. He attended the University of Northern Iowa and was a farmer. He served in the Iowa House of Representatives from 1973 to 1987, as a Democrat. He was majority leader of the house from 1983 to 1987.

References

1931 births
Living people
Democratic Party members of the Iowa House of Representatives
People from Mason City, Iowa
Farmers from Iowa
University of Northern Iowa alumni